Srinivas Sharath (born 1 March 1996) is an Indian cricketer. He made his first-class debut for Karnataka in the 2018–19 Ranji Trophy on 14 December 2018. He made his List A debut on 8 December 2021, for Karnataka in the 2021–22 Vijay Hazare Trophy.

References

External links
 

1996 births
Living people
Indian cricketers
Karnataka cricketers
Place of birth missing (living people)